Margarita Gómez-Acebo y Cejuela (born 6 January 1935) is the wife of Tsar Simeon II of Bulgaria, whom she married after he went into exile. As such, she is also sometimes styled Tsaritsa Margarita; in this context, she may be styled as Princess of Saxe-Coburg and Gotha and Duchess in Saxony, due to her husband's descent from those former ruling families. During her husband's tenure as Prime Minister of Bulgaria, she was sometimes referred as Margarita Sakskoburggotska. The current Bulgarian government does not recognize the titles in exile of the former Bulgarian royal family.

Early life

Birth
Margarita Gómez-Acebo y Cejuela was born on 6 January 1935 in Villa Alba, Collado Villalba, Madrid, during the Second Spanish Republic, as the second child and only daughter of the two children of Spanish nobles: Manuel Gómez-Acebo y Modet, 4th Marquess of Cortina, a state counselor and lawyer of commercial and banking companies (eldest child of José Gómez Acebo y Cortina, 3rd Marquess of Cortina and wife Margarita Marta Modet y Almagro) and wife María de las Mercedes Cejuela y Fernández (daughter of Manuel Cejuela y González-Orduña and wife María de las Mercedes Fernández Molano).

Childhood
In 1936, at the outset of the Spanish Civil War Margarita's parents Manuel and María de las Mercedes as well as her maternal grandmother María de las Mercedes were arrested by the Communists and given a 3-month prison detention. They were executed in November (Manuel on the 9th and María de las Mercedes and her mother María de las Mercedes on the 16th) at their farm "La Arbodela" in Collado Villalba. In recognition of their parents' murders, Margarita and her elder brother José-Luis (1930–2010) both received the Suffering for the Motherland Medal from Francoist Spain.

After the death of their parents, Margarita and José-Luis continued to live at Villa Alba for some time until they were taken in by their fathers close friend The Marquess of Casa Pissaro until May 1937 where the siblings were to go to Northern Spain, but due to the war, they were forced to follow a route via Valencia to Barcelona and then France to stay with their paternal grandmother Doña Margarita Marta Modet y Almagro until her death in 1940 where they were taken in by their paternal uncle Don Juan Gómez-Acebo y Modet, Marquess of Zurgena and his family until his death, where they moved in with their other paternal uncle Don Jaime Gómez-Acebo y Modet and his wife Doña Isabel Duque de Estrada y Vereterra, 9th Marchioness of Deleitosa as well as their children, including Don Luis Gómez-Acebo (later husband of Infanta Pilar of Spain, Duchess of Badajoz, eldest sister of King Juan Carlos I of Spain and aunt of King Felipe VI of Spain.

Residence
Simeon and Margarita currently reside in what was Simeon's boyhood home, Vrana Palace, near Sofia. It was returned to them by the Bulgarian Constitutional Court. The property is operated under an agreement with the Municipality of Sofia, which allows the use of part of the estate as a public park; in return, the remainder and residence have reverted to the ownership of the family. The legality of this transaction is disputed by Bulgarian politicians.

Marriage and family
On 21 January 1962, Doña Margarita married Simeon Saxe-Coburg-Gotha, the former king of Bulgaria. Simeon and Margarita have five children:
 Kardam, Prince of Turnovo (1962–2015); married Doña Miriam Ungría y López, styled HRH Princess Miriam of Bulgaria. They have two sons: Princes Boris and Beltran.
 Kyril, Prince of Preslav (born 1964); married Doña María del Rosario Nadal y Fuster de Puigdórfila, styled HRH Princess Rosario of Bulgaria. They have two daughters, Princesses Mafalda and Olimpia, and one son, Prince Tassilo.
 Kubrat, Prince of Panagyurishte (born 1965). Married Doña Carla María de la Soledad Royo-Villanova y Urrestarazu, styled HRH Princess Carla of Bulgaria, and have three sons, Princes Mirko, Lukás, and Tirso.
 Konstantin-Assen, Prince of Vidin (born 1967). Married Doña María García de la Rasilla y Gortázar, styled HRH Princess Maria of Bulgaria, and have twins, Prince Umberto and Princess Sofia.
Princess Kalina of Bulgaria, Countess of Murany (born 1972). Married Don Antonio José "Kitín" Muñoz y Valcárcel, and has a son, Simeon Hassan.

Honours and awards

National
 : Knight Grand Cross of the Order of Civil Merit
 : Recipient of the Suffering for the Motherland Medal

Dynastic
  House of Saxe-Coburg-Gotha-Koháry: Knight Grand Cross with Collar of the Order of St Alexander
  House of Saxe-Coburg-Gotha-Koháry: Dame Grand Cross of the Royal Order of Civil Merit

Foreign
  Greek Royal Family: Dame Grand Cross of the Royal Order of Beneficence
 : Dame Grand Cross Honour and Devotion of the Sovereign Military Order of Malta, 3rd First Class
 : Recipient of the 70th Birthday Medal of King Carl XVI Gustaf

Patronages

National
 : Patron of the Bulgarian EuroChild Club
 : Patron of the 'For Life' Cancer Charity

Foreign
 : Patron of the Business Women's Society BWS
 : Patron of the International Women's Club IWC

References

Converts to Eastern Orthodoxy from Roman Catholicism
Eastern Orthodox Christians from Spain
Margarita
Spanish nobility
1935 births
Living people

People from Madrid
Grand Crosses of the Order of Beneficence (Greece)
Grand Cross of the Order of Civil Merit